Aldeia Itaóca is a Guarani/Guarani Mbya/Guarani Ñandeva indigenous village located within the municipality of Mongaguá in the state of São Paulo, Brazil. The primary languages spoken are Guarani and Tupi-Guarani.

History 
Aldeia Itaóca was founded in 1970 by the Fundação Nacional do Índio (FUNAI) in an effort to halt the socio-cultural disintegration that was taking place among the Guarani-Tupi-Guarani in Brazil.

Aldeia Itaóca is approximately three miles from the southern coast of the state of São Paulo and connected with the neighboring Guarani village of Aldeia Aguapeu (also part of Mongaguá) via the Aguapeu River. The two indigenous villages in Mongaguá: Itaóca and Aguapeú, located in an Atlantic Forest environmental reserve. The indigenous community of Aguapeú conceived the project "Jaguatareí Nhemboé" Caminhando e Aprendendo ", which aims at recognizing and valuing the Guarani identity and the environment of this indigenous people: the Atlantic Forest biome. Aldeia Itaóca is also just seven miles from another Guarani settlement called Aldeia Rio Branco located within the municipality of Itanhaém.

Mongaguá's history goes back to the time of Brazil's colonization, when the city belonged for many years to the municipality of São Vicente - the first village founded in Brazil, by the Portuguese navigator Martim Afonso de Sousa (1500-1564). In 1624, Mongaguá became part of the Itanhaém township.

Demographics 
In June 2016, Aldeia Itaoca had 127 inhabitants, of whom 78 were Guarani and 49 were Tupi-Guarani. However in 2020 there was just 90 total registered dwellers.

Flora and Fauna
As Aldeia Itaóca is an ecologically protected area, literally located within the Serra do Mar national park of the Mata Atlantica (Atlantic Forest), it is rich in flora and fauna containing many endemic species. Tree species in the area include Cariniana legalis, Brejaúva Palms, etc,  while animal species in Aldeia Itaóca's 2 square kilometer region include; the Yellow-legged thrush (Turdus flavipes) and Smooth-horned Frog Proceratophrys Miranda-Ribeiro).

Notable Resident (Danilo Benites)
Activist and former Chief of Aldeia Itaóca, Danilo Benites (or Vera) has been instrumental in protecting the rights of Guarani people through his annual statewide event Encontro de Jovens Lideranças Guarani do Estado de São Paulo (or Meeting of Young Guarani Leaders of the State of São Paulo). The first edition of the event, in 2017, brought together 60 young people from villages in the State of São Paulo. “Now we get 100 young people from 24 villages in Brazil. There are also people from Rio de Janeiro, Paraná, Santa Catarina, I am proud to make this meeting grow. Because despite the name of the meeting saying ‘State of São Paulo’, the Guarani people have no borders, ”says Danilo Benites. “The white man, he has the Constitution, where our rights are. But he does not respect what is on paper, so we need to teach the young people who are there to defend our struggle, so we need to teach the young people who are there to defend our struggle ”.

For Benites, the biggest challenge is to be able to bring young people into the discussion and teach them how to use the available tools, such as social networks, in favor of the fight. “The rulers, ruralists, non-indigenous people, allege 'the use of technology' against us, to say that we are no longer Indians. So we have to teach young people to use this technology in favor of our struggle ”. Between one table and another, the young man was in charge of introducing the leaders and guests, in Portuguese and Guarani, in addition to encouraging the participation of everyone in the audience. “I have always participated in political discussions, in the events of the elderly. But listening. Because I only learned Portuguese when I was 16 years old. Then I was able to get more involved and fight more for our causes ”.

Notes

References 
 
 
 

Indigenous peoples in Brazil